Malagasy may refer to:

Someone or something from Madagascar
Malagasy people
Malagasy language
Malagasy Republic
Related to the culture of Madagascar

See also
Madagascar (disambiguation)

Language and nationality disambiguation pages